Captain Reuben George Hammersley (born 26 September 1897, date of death unknown) was an English World War I flying ace credited with eight aerial victories.

Biography
Hammersley was born in Leicester, and worked as a Boot factor in Measham before the war. He learned to fly, receiving Royal Aero Club Aviator's Certificate No. 3556 on a Caudron biplane at Wallisdown School, Bournemouth, on 14 September 1916, then joined the Royal Flying Corps as a cadet, being commissioned as a temporary second lieutenant (on probation) on 3 May 1917, and was confirmed in his rank on 27 July.

He was posted to No. 24 Squadron in France, flying an S.E.5a. He gained his first victories on 19 February 1918, when he and Lieutenants Peter MacDougall, Ronald T. Mark and  Andrew Cowper, shot down two aircraft over Servais and Bernot. Hammersley went on to account for six more enemy aircraft between 26 February and 20 May 1918, for a total of eight.

On 1 September 1918 he was appointed a flight commander with the acting rank of captain, and later the same month was awarded the Croix de guerre by France.

Hammersley left the RAF after the war, being transferred to the unemployed list on 25 January 1919.

References

1897 births
Year of death missing
People from Leicester
Royal Flying Corps officers
British World War I flying aces
Recipients of the Croix de Guerre 1914–1918 (France)